The Aggregate effects doctrine, Cumulative effects doctrine, or substantial effects is a legal doctrine in United States federal law. The AED permits extension of the regulation of interstate commerce into any action which affects interstate commerce only when aggregated with other actions. It is most often associated with Wickard v. Filburn 1942. In Wickard a wheat farmer growing wheat solely for animal feed within the confines of his own farm was found to be regulatable because private growth for private consumption was the primary reason for decrease of demand.

Although mostly associated with Wickard, it is also referred to as "substantial effects" in another formative case the preceding year, U.S. v. Darby Lumber Co., 1941. In Fainblatt the "plenary" power of interstate regulation "extends to all such commerce be it great or small" and had never been held "to be constitutionally restricted because in any particular case the volume of the commerce affected may be small."

Since its introduction this doctrine has been applied widely. Some experts apply aggregate effects to the abortion law debate. One common example is alcohol laws, such as Michigan's well known wine shipment restrictions.

References